The Battle of Good's Farm was a short skirmish between the Confederates and the Union in Jackson's Valley Campaign in the American Civil War. During the fighting, Confederate cavalry officer Turner Ashby was killed.

As Stonewall Jackson's army withdrew from the pressure of Major General John C. Frémont's superior forces, moving from Harrisonburg toward Port Republic, Colonel Turner Ashby commanded the rear guard. On June 6, 1862, near Harrisonburg, the 1st New Jersey Cavalry Regiment attacked Ashby's position at Good's Farm. Although Ashby routed the cavalry and captured Colonel Percy Wyndham, a subsequent infantry engagement resulted in his horse being shot and Ashby leading a charge on foot. Within a few steps, he was shot through the heart, killing him instantly.

The origin of the fatal shot has been lost to history. Soldiers of the 13th Pennsylvania Reserve Infantry, the "Bucktails", claimed credit, though some accounts blame friendly fire. Ashby's last words were "Forward my brave men!" He had been nominated for promotion to brigadier general just ten days before his death.

Other casualties included Lieutenant Colonel Thomas L. Kane and Captain Charles Frederick Taylor of the 13th Pennsylvania. Both officers were captured, with Kane being seriously wounded.

References 

Good's Farm, Battle of
Good's Farm
Good's Farm
Good's Farm
Good's Farm
1862 in the American Civil War
1862 in Virginia
June 1862 events